Abbaye de Timadeuc Cheese is a cheese produced in a monastery by Trappist monks. This cow's milk cheese is an uncooked pressed cheese.

Soft and salty it has a soft taste and a nutty aroma. From the family of the uncooked pressed past cheese it has a straw yellow colour and is shaped as a disc with a diameter of 20 cm and a thickness of 4 to 5 cm. Produced in the commune of Bréhan, in the Morbihan, in Brittany this cheese can be compared to Trappe cheese, made by the Trappist monks of the Abbaye de la Coudre

See also 
 Port Salut cheese
 Saint Paulin cheese
 List of French cheeses

References 

Breton cuisine
Cow's-milk cheeses
Trappist cheeses
French cheeses